Pulmonaria angustifolia, the narrow-leaved lungwort or blue cowslip, is a species of flowering plant in the family Boraginaceae, native to central and north eastern Europe. The subspecies azureus has brighter blue flowers.

The specific epithet angustifolia means "narrow-leaved". Despite the common name "blue cowslip" it is not closely related to the true cowslip (Primula veris).

In cultivation it prefers moist soil with dappled shade.

References

Flora of Europe
angustifolia
Plants described in 1753
Taxa named by Carl Linnaeus